Kagwa is in West Uyoma Location, Rarieda Constituency in Siaya County, Kenya.

References

Populated places in Nyanza Province